Scythris asinella is a moth of the family Scythrididae. It was described by Bengt Å. Bengtsson in 2014. It is found in Namibia and Northern Cape, South Africa.

References

asinella
Moths described in 2014